State Route 170 (SR 170) is a state highway in the eastern part of the U.S. state of Tennessee. It travels through portions of Anderson, Knox and Union counties. It connects Oak Ridge to the Maynardville area.

Route description

Anderson County

SR 170 begins in Anderson County in Oak Ridge as Edgemore Road at a trumpet interchange with SR 62 (Illinois Avenue), right across the Clinch River from the town of Solway. It then heads northeast as an improved 2-lane highway, paralleling the Clinch and passing by several golf courses and apartments before coming to an intersection with Melton Lake Drive, just after passing Haw Ridge Park. It then immediately crosses over a long, tall, and narrow bridge over the Clinch River/Melton Hill Lake, entering Claxton and passing by the Bull Run Steam Plant. It then passes through the countryside of the Claxton Community before coming to an intersection with US 25W/SR 9 (Clinton Highway) at the center of the community, right beside the Claxton Elementary School. SR 170 then becomes Raccoon Valley Road as it narrows to a 2-lane country road. SR 170 then leaves Claxton and Anderson County, crossing into Knox County.

Knox County

It then travels down a narrow valley and passes through Heiskell before having an interchange with I-75 (Exit 117). It then transitions to Old Raccoon Valley Road at an intersection where Raccoon Valley Road splits off and goes to the north, just before coming to an intersection and becoming concurrent with US 441/SR 71 (Norris Freeway, which is not an actual freeway but a 2-lane highway). They head northwest through some mountains and hollows, crossing back into Anderson County.

Anderson and Union Counties

SR 170 splits off as Hickory Valley Road and goes northeast as 2-lane country road once again, becoming slightly curvy before crossing into Union County and going down a long valley to enter New Loyston to intersect and have a short, wrong way concurrency with SR 61 (Andersonville Highway) just south of Big Ridge State Park. SR 170 then passes near Hickory Star, intersecting with SR 144 (Hickory Star Road). It then runs parallel to Norris Lake before finally ending at a Y-intersection with SR 33 (Maynardville Highway) just north of Maynardville.

Junction list

See also
 
 
 List of state routes in Tennessee

References

170
Transportation in Anderson County, Tennessee
Transportation in Knox County, Tennessee
Transportation in Union County, Tennessee
Oak Ridge, Tennessee